Franz Sacher (19 December 1816 – 11 March 1907) was an Austrian confectioner, best known as the inventor of the Sachertorte.

Biography

According to Sacher's son Eduard, in 1832 Austria's minister of foreign affairs, Prince Metternich, ordered his court's kitchen to create a special dessert for a dinner to be attended by high-ranking guests. Dass er mir aber keine Schand' macht, heut' Abend! ("Let there be no shame on me tonight!"), he is reported to have declared. Unfortunately, on the day of the dinner the chief cook of Metternich's household was taken ill, and the task of preparing the dessert had to be passed to Franz Sacher, then in his second year of apprenticeship at the palace. The result would be the chocolate cake devised on the spot by the 16-year-old trainee. The story was probably invented by Eduard many years later, to appeal to "Viennese nostalgic for their imperial past".

Sacher was born in Vienna and died in Baden bei Wien, where he was buried in the Catholic Helenenfriedhof (Saint Helena Cemetery). Eduard opened the Hotel Sacher in 1876, near the State Opera House in Vienna. The Sachertorte is said to be instrumental in spreading the fame of the hotel; or perhaps the other way around. The exact recipe as created by Sacher himself is a closely guarded secret.

Personal life 
Franz Sacher and his wife Rosa b. Wieninger had three sons.

 Franz († 1889; Age: 48/49) took over the business of his father in the 1860s, and later became the restaurateur and hotelier in Bucharest, then Head of Marine Casinos in Pula; 
 Eduard (1843–1892) founded the Hotel Sacher in Vienna in 1876;
 Carl (1849–1929) founded Sacher's Hotel & Curanstalt in Helenental in 1881.

Tribute
On December 19, 2016, Google celebrated Sacher's 200th birthday with a Google Doodle.

References

1816 births
1907 deaths
Austro-Hungarian people
Austrian chefs
Confectioners
Businesspeople from Vienna
People from Levice District
People from Baden bei Wien